John Kirkpatrick (1840 – 8 December 1904) was a Scottish-born Australian politician.

He was born in Dumfriesshire to Simon and Elizabeth Kirkpatrick and educated in Glasgow. After working as an apprentice to his uncle, a tailor, he migrated to New Zealand in 1860, and then mined at the Otago goldfields. He met little success planting cotton in Fiji, and around 1871 moved to New South Wales, first at Gulgong and then at Coonabarabran, where he established a store and was twice mayor. He then moved to Gunnedah, where he also served on council and was a director of a co-operative butchery. In either 1880 or 1890, he married Annie Strong, with whom he had nine children. In 1891 Kirkpatrick was elected to the New South Wales Legislative Assembly for Gunnedah, as one of the first group of Labor Party members. Re-elected in 1894, he did not contest the 1895 election, although he did contest the 1898 election as a Free Trade candidate. Kirkpatrick died in 1904 at Gunnedah.

References

 

1840 births
1904 deaths
Members of the New South Wales Legislative Assembly
Australian Labor Party members of the Parliament of New South Wales
19th-century Australian politicians
British emigrants to Australia